The Miss Universo Uruguay 2007 was March 17, 2007. There were 20 candidates for the national title. The winner was Uruguay at Miss Universe 2007 and Reina Hispanoamericana 2007. The first runner up entered Miss Tourism Queen International 2008 and Miss Atlantico. The second runner up was Miss Continente Americano 2007. The Best Departemental Costume was used in Miss Universe.

Results
Miss Universo Uruguay 2007 : Giannina Silva (Artigas)
1st Runner Up : Claudia Vanrell (Montevideo)
2nd Runner Up  : Agostina Padula (Maldonado)
3rd Runner Up : Sofya Guerrero (Treinta y Tres)
4th Runner Up  : Laura Zamora (Distrito Capital)

Top 10

Cassie Spliggione (Florida)
Sandra Velman (Río Negro)
Eva Reynoza (Salto)
Jonairys Tobías (Canelones)
Fernanda Wilkos (San José)

Special awards
 Miss Photogenic (voted by press reporters) - Silvana Quadors (Rocha)
 Miss Congeniality (voted by Miss Universo Uruguay contestants) - Ana Espinoza (Tacuarembó)
 Miss Internet - Claudia Vanrell (Montevideo)
 Best Look - Agostina Padula (Maldonado)
 Best Face - Ericka Suarez (Cerro Largo)
 Beautiful Eyes - Arianna Ynoigline (Paysandú)
 Best Departemental Costume - Joana Torrado (Rivera)

Delegates

Artigas - Giannina Silva
Canelones - Paula Miglionico 
Cerro Largo - Ericka Suarez
Colonia - Ada Fernández
Distrito Capital - Laura Zamora
Durazno - Soila Urotea
Flores - Masiela Málaga
Florida - Cassie Spliggione
Lavalleja - Luisa Fernández
Maldonado - Agostina Padula

Montevideo - Claudia Rossina Vanrell Escalante
Paysandú - Arianna Ynoigline
Río Negro - Sandra Velman
Rivera - Joana Torrado
Rocha - Silvana Quadors 
Salto - Eva Reynoza
San José - Fernanda Wilkos
Soriano - Carolina Foigli
Tacuarembó - Ana Espinoza
Treinta y Tres - Sofya Guerrero

External links
http://www.puntaweb.com/cgi-bin/notas/ver_nota_div.pl?numero_nota=1480
https://web.archive.org/web/20090126015007/http://www.marujeo.com/1040/la-uruguaya-giannina-es-silva-nombrada-como-miss-america-latina-2007/

Miss Universo Uruguay
2007 beauty pageants
2007 in Uruguay